Mainlining is a puzzle point and click adventure indie hacking simulation video game. Mainlining was released on January 26, 2017 for Microsoft Windows.

Gameplay  
Mainlining is a point and click adventure game. The game takes place on the simulated desktop of the player character's computer. Assuming the role of a newly recruited MI7 agent and working within the remit of the Blu Pill Act, the player must use their skill, judgment, and cunning to gather evidence by hacking suspects' computers and phones. As a member of MI7, the player must investigate around in files, folders, websites, online profiles, bank statements, trying to find evidence on a target. The player must submit their evidence, along with the suspect's location, to an "arrest system". If the player gets the right piece of evidence, on the right person and the right place, they get locked up and it is on to the next day's case file.

Reception 

Critics gave the game "mixed or average" reviews, according to review aggregator Metacritic.

Hardcore Gamer gave the game a score of 3.5/5, while KeenGamer gave it a 6.8/10.

References  

2017 video games
Single-player video games
Windows games
Windows-only games
Indie video games
Crowdfunded video games
GameMaker Studio games
Hacking video games
Point-and-click adventure games
Video games developed in the United Kingdom